Edward Boker Sterling  (September 9, 1851 – November 29, 1925), of Trenton, New Jersey, was a philatelist who specialized in the study of United States postage stamps, postal stationery, and revenue stamps.

Collecting interests
Sterling is famous for his collection and study of United States revenue stamps, which are essentially tax stamps on certain goods and commodities issued by the federal government. Sterling amassed one of the finest such collections and sold it to Hiram Edmund Deats in 1888 for what was then the huge sum of seven thousand dollars.

In 1890, he and Deats joined together and purchased seven boxcar loads (amounting to 213 tons) of “excessed” paperwork from the U.S. Treasury. They discovered that the lot contained a “gold mine” of revenue stamps, including unused ones. The government eventually discovered its error, and demanded return of the lot, with most of it being returned.

After selling his revenue collection to Deats, Sterling became a stamp dealer, still specializing in revenue stamps. He made several important purchases, such as the archives of Philadelphia, Pennsylvania security printers and engravers Butler and Carpenter which contained both private and government revenue stamps. The archives contained essays, proofs, “special tax stamps” and other collateral material, most of which he subsequently sold to Deats.

Philatelic literature
Sterling issued his postage stamp catalog of United States stamps in 1887. In 1888, he issued his revenue stamp catalog of the United States, which became the standard reference for revenues.

Honors and awards
Sterling was admitted to the American Philatelic Society Hall of Fame in 1997.

See also
 Philately
 Philatelic literature

References
 Edward Boker Sterling

External links
 

1851 births
1925 deaths
Philatelic literature
American philatelists
American stamp dealers
People from Trenton, New Jersey
American Philatelic Society